Knaresborough Castle is a ruined fortress overlooking the River Nidd in the town of Knaresborough, North Yorkshire, England.

History
There is documentary evidence dating from 1130 referring to works carried out at the castle by Henry I. In the 1170s Hugh de Moreville and his followers took refuge there after assassinating Thomas Becket.

William de Stuteville was appointed as Governor of Knaresborough castle in Easter 1173. After de Stuteville's death in 1203, King John gave Hubert Walter, Archbishop of Canterbury, custody of all of William de Stuteville's lands and castles and the wardship of his son and heir Robert de Stuteville. However, Robert died in 1205 and William's brother Nicholas de Stuteville became William's heir. A charter dated at Lambeth 5th August 1205 confirmed that Nicholas had paid a fine of 10,000 marks for his inheritance, with the exception of the castles of Knaresborough and Boroughbridge, which were retained by the King.

The King regarded Knaresborough as an important northern fortress and spent £1,290 on improvements to the castle. In August 1304, Elizabeth of Rhuddlan, a daughter of Edward I, travelled from Linlithgow Palace to Knaresborough Castle. She gave birth to her son, Humphrey, in September, assisted by a holy relic of the girdle of the Virgin, brought especially from Westminster Abbey.

The castle was rebuilt at a cost of £2,174 between 1307 and 1312 by Edward I and completed by Edward II, including the great keep. Edward II gave the castle to Piers Gaveston and stayed there himself when the unpopular nobleman was besieged at Scarborough Castle.

Philippa of Hainault took possession of the castle in 1331, at which point it became a royal residence. The queen often spent summers there with her family. Her son, John of Gaunt acquired the castle in 1372, adding it to the vast holdings of the Duchy of Lancaster. Katherine Swynford, Gaunt's third wife, obtained the castle upon his death.

A detailed survey of the state of the castle buildings was made in 1561. The building was used by estate auditors and law courts were held in the hall.

The castle was taken by Parliamentarian troops in 1644 during the Civil War and largely destroyed in 1648, not as the result of warfare but because of an order from Parliament to dismantle all Royalist castles. Indeed many town-centre buildings are built of 'castle stone'.

Present day 
The remains of the castle are open to the public and there is a charge for entry to the interior remains. The grounds are used as a public leisure space, with a bowling green and putting green open during the summer. It is also used as a performing space. It plays host to frequent events, such as the annual FEVA (Festival of Visual Arts and Entertainment). The property is owned by the monarch as part of the Duchy of Lancaster holdings, but is administered by Harrogate Borough Council.

Description
The castle, now much ruined, comprised two walled baileys set one behind the other, with the outer bailey on the town side and the inner bailey on the cliff side. The enclosure wall was punctuated by solid towers along its length, and a pair, visible today, formed the main gate. At the junction between the inner and outer baileys, on the north side of the castle stood a tall five-sided keep, the eastern parts of which have been pulled down. The keep had a vaulted basement, at least three upper stories, and served as a residence for the lord of the castle throughout the castle's history. The castle baileys contained residential buildings, and some foundations have survived. In 1789, historian Ely Hargrove wrote that the castle contained "only three rooms on a floor, and measures, in front, only fifty-four feet."

The upper storey of the Courthouse features a museum that includes furniture from the original Tudor Court, as well as exhibits about the castle and the town.

References
Notes

Bibliography

Fry, Plantagenet Somerset, The David & Charles Book of Castles, David & Charles, 1980, p. 249.

External links
Knaresborough Castle & Museum
Knaresborough Castle on castlexplorer.co.uk

Tourist attractions in North Yorkshire
Castles in North Yorkshire
Ruins in North Yorkshire
Museums in North Yorkshire
Local museums in North Yorkshire
Knaresborough
De Vesci family